Umut is a Turkish given name.

Umut may also refer to:                         

 Umut (film), a 1970 Turkish drama film
 The University Museum, The University of Tokyo, a museum in Tokyo, Japan

See also
 Ümit, a given name and surname